Charliena White is a Montserratian politician. She has been Speaker of the Legislative Assembly of Montserrat since 20 December 2020.

See also 

 List of speakers of the Legislative Council of Montserrat

References 

Living people
Speakers of the Legislative Assembly of Montserrat
21st-century British women politicians
Women legislative speakers
Montserratian women in politics
Year of birth missing (living people)